The Human Jukebox is the marching band representing Southern University and A&M College located in Baton Rouge, Louisiana.

Band Profile

T. Leroy Davis is credited with establishing Southern University's marching band and served as the band director between 1947 and 1964.  He also helped organize the first Southern University Band Festival and Band Day and was well-known for his contributions and achievements in music. Davis was given the title of Professor Emeritus for his many years of service to the university in 1989.

The band is anchored by the Isaac Greggs Band Hall on campus.  Dr. Isaac Greggs (Doc) was an award-winning band director and alumnus of Southern University that led the band for 36 years (1969 - 2005).  Under his leadership, the band grew in popularity and established a distinctive identity.  In addition to having the band hall renamed in his honor, he was inducted into the Louisiana Black History Hall of Fame in 2013 and had a display case dedicated in his honor at the National Museum of African American History and Culture in 2016.

The Human Jukebox has been consistently recognized as the best marching band in the nation by USA Today, NCAA, ESPN, and Time. The band is highly regarded for its powerful sound, soulful arrangements, extensive song catalog, and entertaining showmanship.

Since 1969, the Human Jukebox has been often accompanied by The Fabulous Dancing Dolls.  Gracie Perkins co-founded the Dolls with Dr. Greggs.  The Dolls are best known for their stylish dance uniforms, graceful choreography, and beauty standards. A notable highlight in Dolls' history is when they were invited to perform with world pop-star Madonna for her live Super Bowl halftime performance in 2012.  In 2019, the Dolls were featured in Beyonce's Netflix documentary "HΘMΣCΘMING: A film by Beyonce". In 2022, the Dolls starred in an eight-episode docu-series executive produced by NBA player Chris Paul on ESPN+ entitled "Why Not Us: Southern Dance".

One of the most anticipated traditions of the Human Jukebox is the Friday night "Battle of the Bands" versus Grambling's "World Famed" Tiger Marching Band during Bayou Classic weekend in the Mercedes-Benz Superdome.  The annual event draws tens of thousands of alumni, fans, and spectators. Clips of it is aired on NBC's nationally televised broadcast of Saturday's football game. A YouTube video of the Human Jukebox's soulful rendition of Adele's hit single "Hello" from the 2015 Bayou Classic Battle of the Bands went viral which resulted in the band garnering overwhelmingly positive press both nationally and internationally.  The video received over 1 million views in less than two weeks and was one of the nation's top trending topics on social media the week of its release. In 2019, Vice Media released a documentary detailing the historical and cultural significance of the Human Jukebox and their annual band battle against Grambling's "World Famed" Tiger Marching band in New Orleans.

In October 2017, Raising Cane's Chicken Fingers (Baton Rouge-based national restaurant corporation) announced a partnership with The Southern University Human Jukebox, making Raising Cane's the "Official Chicken of the SU Human Jukebox." At the 2017 Bayou Classic Battle of the Bands, State Representative Ted James & J Morgan & Associates unveiled the official Human Jukebox state license plate for the citizens of Louisiana, making The Human Jukebox the first marching band in the nation with a license plate.

The Human Jukebox performed at the Super Bowl six times as of 2020 and has a long-standing reputation of making appearances at many types of highly visible events.   For example, in 1997, the Human Jukebox performed at the inaugural parade for President Bill Clinton.  In 2015, the Human Jukebox performed for the grand introduction of Floyd Mayweather in the MGM Grand Arena of Las Vegas for "The Fight of The Century".  Top 100 Billboard artist Lizzo featured the Human Jukebox and Fabulous Dancing Dolls in her 2019 music video "Good as Hell". The Human Jukebox and Fabulous Dancing Dolls traveled to Pasadena, California in December 2019 to participate in the 131st Rose Parade on New Years day. This was the marching band's second appearance in the parade, with the first occurring 40 years ago in 1980.

The Human Jukebox is one of the most watched and followed collegiate marching bands in the nation with over 200,000 followers on Facebook, over 100,000 subscribers on YouTube, over 90,000 followers on Instagram, and several social media videos reaching over 1 million views.

Primary Repertoire

The Human Jukebox primary repertoire includes the following:
The SU Alma Mater
The SU Fight Song
The SU Spirit Song, inspired by a 19th century Gospel song
"Do Watcha Wanna", a New Orleans brass band classic
"Talkin' Out the Side of Your Neck", a Funk/R&B classic by Cameo
"I Don't Give A", a Hip-Hop song by Lil Jon & The East Side Boyz
"Black and Blues", a Jazz/R&B song by Al Jarreau
"I'm So Glad I Go to Southern U.", inspired by "I'm So Glad" from Delta blues legend Skip James

Band Leadership

See also
Jackson State–Southern University rivalry
Honda Battle of the Bands
Grambling State-Southern University rivalry

References

External links
 

Southern University
African-American culture
Southwestern Athletic Conference marching bands
Musical groups from Louisiana
Musical groups established in 1947
1947 establishments in Louisiana